Fungal pheromone mating factor receptors form a distinct family of G-protein-coupled receptors.

Function 
Mating factor receptors STE2 and STE3 are integral membrane proteins that may be involved in the response to mating factors on the cell membrane. The amino acid sequences of both receptors contain high proportions of hydrophobic residues grouped into 7 domains, in a manner reminiscent of the rhodopsins and other receptors believed to interact with G-proteins.

References

G protein-coupled receptors
Protein domains
Protein families
Membrane proteins